Caedicia is a genus of bush crickets or katydids in the subfamily Phaneropterinae. Species can be found Australasia, with records from Vietnam, Papua New Guinea, and Australia.

Species
The Orthoptera Species File and Catalogue of Life list:

Caedicia acutifolia Brunner von Wattenwyl, 1878
Caedicia affinis Bolívar, 1902
Caedicia albidiceps Walker, 1869
Caedicia araucariae Rentz, 1988
Caedicia bispinulosa Brunner von Wattenwyl, 1878
Caedicia chloronota Bolívar, 1902
Caedicia chyzeri Bolívar, 1902
Caedicia clavata Bolívar, 1902
Caedicia concisa Brunner von Wattenwyl, 1878
Caedicia congrua Walker, 1869
Caedicia extenuata Walker, 1869
Caedicia flexuosa Bolívar, 1902
Caedicia gloriosa Hebard, 1922
Caedicia goobita Rentz, Su & Ueshima, 2008
Caedicia gracilis Rentz, 1988
Caedicia halmaturina Tepper, 1892
Caedicia hirsuta Tepper, 1892
Caedicia inermis Brunner von Wattenwyl, 1878
Caedicia kuranda Rentz, Su & Ueshima, 2008
Caedicia longipennis Brunner von Wattenwyl, 1878
Caedicia longipennoides Tepper, 1892
Caedicia marginata Brunner von Wattenwyl, 1878
Caedicia mesochides Rentz, 1988
Caedicia minor Brunner von Wattenwyl, 1878
Caedicia noctivaga Rentz, 1988
Caedicia obtusifolia Brunner von Wattenwyl, 1878
Caedicia paraopeba Piza, 1980
Caedicia pictipes Stål, 1874 - Type species (from Queensland)
Caedicia porrecta Brunner von Wattenwyl, 1879
Caedicia punctifera Walker, 1871
Caedicia scalaris Brunner von Wattenwyl, 1878
Caedicia septentrionalis Brunner von Wattenwyl, 1878
Caedicia simplex Walker, 1869
Caedicia strenua Walker, 1869
Caedicia thymifolia Fabricius, 1775
Caedicia valida Walker, 1869
Caedicia webberi Rentz, Su & Ueshima, 2008

Gallery

References

Orthoptera genera
Phaneropterinae